Sápmi Pride is a pride festival with Sápmi focus arranged annually since 2014.

History 
The festival, organised by Queering Sápmi, took place for the first time in 2014 in Kiruna, in Lapland.  The festival, which went on for four days, featured a performance by Sápmi singer Sofia Jannok, and a parade of 300 participants which traveled through the central city. The following year, the festival took place in Karasjok in Northern Norway.  Maxida Märak performed at the festival and there were workshops with Asta Balto and Erland Elias. The fourth Sápmi pride took place in Inari in Finland in 2017, the first time the event had been held in Finnish Sápmi. The theme of the festival was generations and solidarity, and it featured discussions with journalist Martta Alajärvi, drama director Pauliina Feodoroff.  In 2018, Sápmi Pride took place in Östersund in Sweden.

Events 
{|
|- style="vertical-align:top"
|

References 

Pride parades in Europe
Sámi culture
LGBT in Norway
LGBT events in Sweden
LGBT events in Finland
LGBT Sámi people